Lee Joo-yeon (born March 19, 1987), formerly known mononymously as Jooyeon, is a South Korean actress and singer. She is best known for being a former member of the girl group After School. Since leaving After School, she has focused primarily on acting. She made her acting debut in the drama Smile Again (2010) and has made several participation in other dramas since then.

Career

2007-2014: Pre-debut and career beginnings
In 2007, Jooyeon made a cameo in the movie My Tutor Friend 2, playing the role of Azumi. Before her debut, Jooyeon was famous on the internet for being an Ulzzang, or "best face" which consisted of her being well known for her natural beauty features. She made her first unofficial appearance with After School's on December 29, 2008, at the SBS Song Festival, performing "Play Girlz" with Son Dam-bi.

On January 15, 2009, Jooyeon made her debut in South Korean girl group After School, with the release of their debut single "AH!" alongside their EP, New Schoolgirl. On 17 January, the group made their live debut on MBC's, Music Core.

In 2010, Jooyeon made her acting debut with the drama Smile Again and was a member of G7 in the variety show Invincible Youth. Over the years, she starred as supporting roles in various dramas and movies.

In 2011, she became the leader of A.S. Blue. The sub-unit debuted with the single "Wonder Boy" on July 20.

On December 31, 2014, Jooyeon's contract with Pledis Entertainment expired and she graduated from After School on June 30, 2015, after Japan promotions. Jooyeon was the only member, along with Jungah, who was in the group for all promotional periods.

2015-present: Acting career and further roles
In January 2015, following her graduation from After School, Jooyeon signed with Better ENT to pursue her acting career. She made her first appearance under her new company in the film Sorry, I Love You, Thank You, playing the role of Jung Hye-mi. She has since gone on to star in a number of dramas, such as All Kinds of Daughters-In-Law.

In 2017, Lee took on acting roles in crime flick The King and historical drama Saimdang, Memoir of Colors. In 2018, Jooyeon's contract with Better ENT expired and she began looking for a new agency. She subsequently signed with Mystic Story. Later that year, Jooyeon took on supporting roles in The Undateables and Devilish Charm.

On May 27, 2021, Lee signed with C-JeS Entertainment.

Personal life 
On February 22, 2011, Jooyeon graduated from Dongduk Women's University with a major in broadcasting.

On November 21, 2011, Jooyeon was admitted to the hospital with acute nephritis. On November 29, she was discharged and had resumed all group activities.

Discography

Filmography

Film

Television series

Web series

Variety shows

References

External links

1987 births
Living people
People from Seoul
Actresses from Seoul
Singers from Seoul
Pledis Entertainment artists
South Korean female idols
South Korean women pop singers
South Korean television actresses
South Korean film actresses
Mystic Entertainment artists
Dongduk Women's University alumni
After School (band) members
21st-century South Korean women singers
Better ENT artists